"Das Boot" (released in the UK and US as "The Boat") is the title theme to the film and TV series Das Boot, composed and produced by Klaus Doldinger, and released as a single in 1981. In 1991, the song was covered by Alex Christensen and his dance music project U96. This techno version was U96's debut single from the album of the same name.

On the German Singles Chart, the U96 version of "Das Boot" spent 13 weeks at number one in early 1992. It also became a number-one hit in Austria, Israel, Norway and Switzerland and entered the top 10 in Denmark, Finland, France, the Netherlands and Sweden. In the UK, it peaked at number 18 on the UK Singles Chart. The song was the subject of many remixes throughout the years.

Critical reception
Pan-European magazine Music & Media noted that "with no significant airplay, this techno version of the theme to the movie "Das Boot" is number one for the second consecutive week in Germany. It's like Kraftwerk on acid, or plain Front 242." James Hamilton from Music Weeks RM Dance Update wrote that "this Hamburg based DJ's vocoder produced and Asdic pinged techno treatment of Klaus Doldinger's original theme is in basic chugging 0-122.9bpm Techno (with beat losing edits midway), far fiercer smoothly thrumming electro 0-127.1bpm Strings 127, Accordian, Echo Mix, 127 BPM and — fiercest of all — 0-130.9bpm 131 BPM Versions. Dive! Dive! Dive!"

Chart performance
"Das Boot" peaked at number one in Germany, Norway and Switzerland. In Germany, it spent 13 weeks atop the chart. The single also made it to the top 10 in Denmark, Finland, France, the Netherlands and Sweden, as well as on the Eurochart Hot 100, where it reached number three. Additionally, "Das Boot" peaked within the Top 20 in Belgium, Ireland and the United Kingdom. In the latter, it debuted at number 37, and peaked at number 18 in its third week on the UK Singles Chart, on 6 September 1992. Outside Europe, the single was a huge hit in Israel, where it peaked at number-one in April 1992. It was also awarded with a gold record in Austria, with a sale of 15,000 singles.

Music video
The music video for "Das Boot" was directed by Peter Claridge. It used footage from the 1981 German submarine film Das Boot, directed by Wolfgang Petersen. When the song peaked at number one in Germany, the video had not yet been produced. 

Track listings

 7-inch single "Das Boot"
 "Das Boot" (Mickey Finn full version)

 12-inch maxi "Das Boot" (techno version) – 5:14
 "Tiefenrausch" – 4:18

 CD maxi "Das Boot" (techno version) – 5:14
 "Tiefenrausch" – 4:18
 "Das Boot" (trigger version) – 5:14

 Cassette "Das Boot" (techno version) – 5:14
 "Das Boot" (trigger version) – 5:14

 CD maxi – Remixes "Das Boot / Kennedy" (Megamix – I Wanna Be a Kennedy) – 6:14
 "Sonar Sequences – 6:13
 "Das Boot" – 3:25

 CD maxi – 2001 remixes "Das Boot 2001" (radio edit) – 3:41
 "Das Boot 2001" (DJ Mellow-D remix) – 8:22
 "Das Boot 2001" (Cosmic Gate remix) – 7:41
 "Anthem 2001" – 3:19

 12-inch maxi – 2001 remixes'
 "Das Boot 2001" (Cosmic Gate remix) – 7:41
 "Das Boot 2001" (DJ Errik remix) – 8:05
 "Das Boot 2001" (Schiller remix) – 8:23
 "Das Boot 2001" (Avancada remix) – 8:12

Charts and sales

Weekly charts

"Das Boot"

"Boot II"

"Das Boot 2001"

Year-end charts

Certifications

Release history

See also
 Das Boot (novel), a novel by Lothar-Günther Buchheim from 1973
 Das Boot (TV series), a German television series sequel to the 1981 film
 Das Boot (album), a 1992 album by U96 from 1992
 Das Boot (video game), a 1991 video game inspired by the novel of the same name

References

1981 songs
1981 singles
1991 debut singles
1995 singles
2001 singles
Film theme songs
Number-one singles in Austria
Number-one singles in Germany
Number-one singles in Israel
Number-one singles in Norway
Number-one singles in Switzerland
Polydor Records singles
Song recordings produced by Alex Christensen
Songs about boats
Songs written for films
U96 songs